The Fountain Valley massacre was a mass shooting that occurred on the afternoon of 6 September 1972 at the Fountain Valley Golf Course in St. Croix, United States Virgin Islands. The shooting left eight employees and tourists dead. Another eight were either shot at or wounded.

The massacre
The perpetrators were five Virgin Islanders, Raphael Joseph, Ishmael LaBeet, Meral Smith, Warren Ballentine, and Beaumont Gereau. Authorities initially believed the five had committed the execution-style shootings in the course of a robbery gone bad. However, led by civil rights activist lawyers William Kunstler and Chauncey Eskridge, the defense argued in part that the accused were politically motivated victims of systematic race-based civil rights deprivation; all of the defendants were Afro-Caribbean, while seven of the eight victims were white. Joseph and Ballentine testified that they had only planned on committing a robbery, but that things got out of hand because LaBeet was adamant that they also make "a political statement"; LaBeet told them "he was angry about foreigners coming in to take our money and leaving us with nothing." According to Joseph, during the commission of the robbery LaBeet suddenly began shooting people, while yelling epithets like, "I hate you white motherfuckers!" 

LaBeet, who escaped from custody and fled to Cuba in 1984, has denied this version of events, as well as any involvement at all in the shooting.

Trial and convictions
All five defendants were convicted after a trial in the District Court of the Virgin Islands, a federal territorial court, on multiple charges of murder, assault, and robbery under Virgin Islands law. Each was sentenced to eight consecutive life terms. The convictions were affirmed in 1974 by the U.S. Court of Appeals for the Third Circuit, which subsequently also upheld the denial of motions for a new trial.

Aftermath
The public's perception of a racial motivation for the killings and fear of further violence led to a steep decline in tourism to St. Croix, from which the island's tourism industry did not begin to recover until decades later.

On 31 December 1984, the group's leader, Ishmael LaBeet (then calling himself Ismail Muslim Ali), hijacked American Airlines Flight 626 while in United States federal custody on a transfer to a new place of detention. The flight was forced to land in Cuba, where LaBeet escaped. He was never recaptured. With the thawing of Cuban–American relations in 2015, LaBeet was confirmed to be living at large in Cuba following an indeterminate amount of time spent in a Cuban prison. LaBeet was the subject of the 2016 documentary film The Skyjacker's Tale.

Joseph received a pardon from the Governor of the U.S. Virgin Islands in 1994 after 22 years' imprisonment, but died four years later of a drug overdose. The other three served 29 years in federal prisons before being returned to Virgin Islands custody, and then retransferred to private prisons in the United States.

References

Attacks on tourists
1972 murders in the United States
1972 in the United States Virgin Islands
Crimes in the United States Virgin Islands
Events in the United States Virgin Islands
Mass murder in 1972
Mass murder in the United States
Massacres in 1972
Racially motivated violence against European Americans
Saint Croix, U.S. Virgin Islands
September 1972 events in North America